Shayla Brianna Smart (born 30 May 2000) is an American-born Jamaican footballer who played as a forward for Wake Forest Demon Deacons and currently plays for the Jamaica women's national team.

Early life and education
Smart was born to a Jamaican father and a Puerto Rican mother. She attended the Wake Forest University in Winston-Salem, North Carolina.

International career
Smart has represented Jamaica on the senior national team as well as the under-17 and under-20 national teams. She competed at the 2016 CONCACAF Women's U-17 Championship and the 2018 CONCACAF Women's U-20 Championship. She made her senior debut on 28 July 2019 against Mexico in the Pan American Games.

References

External links

2000 births
Living people
Citizens of Jamaica through descent
Jamaican women's footballers
Women's association football forwards
Jamaica women's international footballers
Pan American Games competitors for Jamaica
Footballers at the 2019 Pan American Games
Jamaican people of Puerto Rican descent
Sportspeople of Puerto Rican descent
People from Apopka, Florida
Sportspeople from Orange County, Florida
Soccer players from Florida
American women's soccer players
Wake Forest Demon Deacons women's soccer players
Women's Premier Soccer League players
African-American women's soccer players
American sportspeople of Jamaican descent
American sportspeople of Puerto Rican descent
21st-century African-American sportspeople
21st-century African-American women
20th-century African-American sportspeople
20th-century African-American women
20th-century African-American people